Ivan Sergeyevich Noskov (Russian: Иван Сергеевич Носков; born 16 July 1988 in Novopetropavlovskoe, Dalmatovsky District, Kurgan Oblast) is a Russian race walker. He won the bronze medal in the 50 kilometres walk event at the 2014 European Athletics Championships in Zürich, Switzerland.

Doping case
In September 2015 IAAF confirmed that Noskov was provisionally suspended after a sample from an out-of-competition control in Saransk in June had been found positive for a prohibited substance. 

In October 2016, the Court of Arbitration for Sport decided to disqualify five Russian track and field athletes, including Ivan Noskov, because traces of Erythropoietin (EPO) were detected in all of the athletes.

Personal bests

Competition record

References

External links

1988 births
Living people
People from Kurgan Oblast
Russian male racewalkers
World Athletics Championships athletes for Russia
European Athletics Championships medalists
Doping cases in athletics
Russian sportspeople in doping cases
Sportspeople from Kurgan Oblast